Isaac Berenblum, (Hebrew: יצחק ברנבלום, born 26 August 1903, died 18 April 2000) was an Israeli biochemist, who in 1947 proposed that cancers need another trigger to grow besides mutated DNA.

Awards
 In 1974, Berenblum was awarded the Israel Prize, in life science.
In 1980, he received the Alfred P. Sloan Jr. Prize given by the General Motors Cancer Research Foundation.

See also 
List of Israel Prize recipients

References

External links
 
 Prof. Isaac BERENBLUM
 Charter Members | World Academy of Art & Science

1903 births
2000 deaths
20th-century Polish Jews
Israeli biochemists
Alumni of the University of Leeds
Israel Prize in life sciences recipients
Israel Prize in life sciences recipients who were biochemists
Members of the Israel Academy of Sciences and Humanities
Academic staff of Weizmann Institute of Science
Academic staff of the Hebrew University of Jerusalem
Polish emigrants to Israel